Madeleine Talmage Astor (née Force; later Dick and Fiermonte; June 19, 1893 – March 27, 1940) was an American socialite and a survivor of the . She was the second wife and widow of businessman John Jacob Astor IV.

Early life

Madeleine Talmage Force was born on June 19, 1893, in Brooklyn, New York, the younger daughter of William Hurlbut Force (1852–1917) and the former Katherine Arvilla Talmage (1863–1930). Madeleine's elder sister Katherine Emmons Force was a real estate businesswoman and socialite. Through her father, she had French ancestry and was a great-niece of builder Ephraim S. Force (1822 – March 12, 1914). Her mother had Dutch ancestry.

William Force was a member of a well-established business family. He owned the successful shipping firm William H. Force and Co., and his father had been prosperous in the manufacturing industry. In 1889, Force married Katherine Talmage, the granddaughter of former Brooklyn mayor Thomas Talmage. The Forces were part of Brooklyn high society, while William Force was a member of numerous prestigious clubs in the city. He also owned an art collection. Like the Astor family, the Forces were members of the Episcopal Church. Madeleine's maternal grandfather was New York State Assemblyman Tunis V. P. Talmage and her great-grandfather, Thomas G. Talmage, was Mayor of Brooklyn. She is also distantly related to Col. Benjamin Tallmadge, who served directly under George Washington in the American War of Independence.

Madeleine was educated at Miss Ely's School and then for four years at Miss Spence's School, on West 48th Street in Manhattan. According to one report, she was "counted an especially brilliant pupil" at this school. She and her sister were also taken abroad by their mother and toured Europe several times. When she was introduced to New York social life, she was immediately adopted by the Junior League, a clique of debutantes. She appeared in several New York society plays and attracted quite a following. She was known to be a very competent horsewoman and enjoyed yachting. One report said she was bright and good with drawing-room conversation.

Courtship and first marriage

She met Colonel John Jacob "Jack" Astor IV, the only son of businessman William Backhouse Astor, Jr. and socialite Caroline Webster "Lina" Schermerhorn. During their courtship, he took her on automobile drives and yacht trips, and they were often followed by the press. They became engaged in August 1911 and were married on September 9, 1911. There was a considerable amount of opposition to his marriage not only because of their age difference (29 years apart, with Madeline being 18, and John at 47) but because of his recent divorce (November 1909) from his previous wife.  After several Episcopal priests refused to celebrate the nuptials, the couple were eventually married by a Congregationalist minister in Beechwood, his Newport mansion. His son William Vincent Astor served as best man.

After their marriage, they had an extended honeymoon. They visited several places locally first, then in January 1912, they sailed from New York on the Titanic's sister ship, the Olympic, and enjoyed a long Egyptian tour. While returning from this part of their honeymoon, they booked their passage on the Titanic.

Aboard the Titanic

Madeleine Astor, then five months pregnant, boarded the Titanic as a first-class passenger in Cherbourg, France, with her husband; her husband's valet, Victor Robbins; her maid, Rosalie Bidois; and her nurse, Caroline Endres. They also took Kitty, Astor's pet Airedale, and occupied one of the parlour suites. On the night of April 14, 1912, Colonel Astor reported to his wife that the ship had hit an iceberg. He reassured her that the damage did not appear serious, though he helped her strap on her life jacket. Whilst they were waiting on the boat-deck, Mrs. Astor lent Leah Aks, a third-class passenger, her fur shawl to keep her son, Filly, warm. At one point, the Astors retired to the gymnasium and sat on the mechanical horses in their life jackets. Colonel Astor found another life jacket which he reportedly cut with a pen knife to show Madeleine what it was made of. When it was time to board a lifeboat, Madeleine Astor, her maid, and her nurse had to crawl through the first-class promenade window into the tilting lifeboat 4 (which had been lowered down to A deck to take on more passengers). Astor had helped his wife to climb through the window and asked if he could accompany her as she was 'in a delicate condition'. The request was denied by Second Officer Charles Lightoller. An account of Madeleine's boarding of the lifeboat was given by Archibald Gracie IV to the US Senate Titanic inquiry. Gracie was a fellow passenger and recalled the events regarding Madeleine Astor  in the following terms.

The only incident I remember in particular at this point is when Mrs Astor was put in the boat. She was lifted up through the window, and her husband helped her on the other side, and when she got in, her husband was on one side of this window and I was on the other side, at the next window. I heard Mr Astor ask the second officer whether he would not be allowed to go aboard this boat to protect his wife. He said, 'No, sir, no man is allowed on this boat or any of the boats until the ladies are off.' Mr Astor then said, 'Well, tell me what is the number of this boat so I may find her afterwards,' or words to that effect. The answer came back, 'No. 4.'

Astor and his valet died in the sinking; the former's body was recovered on April 22. He was found to be carrying about $2,500 in cash, brought with him from his cabin. His young widow and the other survivors were rescued by the RMS Carpathia around 03:30.

Madeleine Astor gave an account of what she recalled almost immediately after her arrival home through her spokesman Nicholas Biddle, who was a trustee of the Astor estate. The account given by her spokesman is:

Widowhood

After Astor returned home from her ordeal, she was kept in strict retirement. Her first social function was not until the end of May, when she held a luncheon at her mansion on Fifth Avenue for Arthur Rostron, the captain of the Carpathia, and Dr. Frank McGee, the ship's surgeon. She held this event with Marian Thayer, also a survivor of the Titanic. Both wished to thank these men for their assistance when they were aboard the Carpathia.

In his will, John Jacob Astor IV left his wife an outright sum of $100,000, the income from a trust fund of $5 million, and the use of the house on Fifth Avenue. Both of the latter provisions she would lose if she remarried. A fund of $3 million was set aside for his unborn child John Jacob "Jakey" Astor VI, which he would control when he became of age. On August 14, 1912, Astor gave birth to Jakey at her Fifth Avenue mansion. For the next four years, she raised him as part of the Astor family. She did not seem to appear very often in society until the end of 1913, when according to the press, they published her first photograph since the Titanic disaster.

After this, she appeared more often in public and her activities were frequently reported in the press. In 1915 she remodeled her house on Fifth Avenue and this was made a feature article in the New York Sun. Many articles about her eldest son were also published.

Remarriages

Four years after Colonel Astor's death, Madeleine Astor married her childhood friend, banker William Karl Dick (May 28, 1888 – September 5, 1953), on June 22, 1916, in Bar Harbor, Maine, and honeymooned in California. He was a vice president of the Manufacturers Trust Company of New York and a part owner and director of the Brooklyn Times. As stated in Colonel Astor's will, she lost her stipend from his trust fund. They had two sons:
 William Force Dick (April 11, 1917 – December 4, 1961)
 John Henry Dick (May 12, 1919 – September 18, 1995) ornithologist, photographer, naturalist, conservationist, author, painter, and bird illustrator

They divorced on July 21, 1933, in Reno, Nevada. Four months later, on November 27, 1933, Astor married Italian actor/boxer Enzo Fiermonte in a civil ceremony in New York City. They honeymooned in Palm Beach, Florida. They eventually moved there. They had no children together and divorced on June 11, 1938, in West Palm Beach, Florida.

Death
Madeleine Fiermonte died of a heart ailment at her mansion in Palm Beach on March 27, 1940, at the age of 46. She was buried in Trinity Church Cemetery in New York City, in a mausoleum with her mother.

In popular culture

Film and TV
 Charlotte Thiele (Titanic, 1943)
 Frances Bergen (Titanic, 1953)
 Beverly Ross (S.O.S. Titanic, 1979 TV movie)
 Janne Mortil (Titanic, 1996 miniseries)
 Charlotte Chatton (Titanic, 1997)
 Piper Gunnarson (Ghosts of the Abyss, 2003 documentary)
 Angéla Eke (Titanic, 2012 miniseries)

Books and literature
 The Second Mrs. Astor, by Shana Abé (2021)

References

External links

 
 Madeleine Astor Death Certificate on Titanic-Titanic.com
 Madeleine Astor  at Titanic-Passengers.com

1893 births
1940 deaths
Madeleine
Livingston family
RMS Titanic survivors
People from Brooklyn
Burials at Trinity Church Cemetery
Spence School alumni